Zaetta is a surname. Notable people with the surname include:

Julia Zaetta, Australian journalist and magazine editor
Tania Zaetta (born 1969/1970), Australian actress and television presenter

See also
 Zatta
 Zetta-